London Buses route 159 is a Transport for London contracted bus route in London, England. Running between Streatham station and Oxford Circus Underground station, it is operated by Abellio London.

History

When introduced, the route was operated by STL-class double-deckers. In 1951, RTs and RTLs replaced the STLs.                                                              During 1960s, 1970s and beginnings of 1980s, the 159 route went between West End Green  (West Hampstead) and Thornton Heath. In June 1970, the RTs were replaced by AEC Routemasters. During the 1990s, London Buses' South London Transport subsidiary operated the route with Routemasters in a unique red and cream livery which was retained after South London was privatised and acquired by the Cowie Group in January 1995.

On 9 December 2005, route 159 was the last route to be converted from Routemaster to low-floor bus operation, with new Alexander ALX400 bodied Volvo B7TL double deckers taking over. The route was converted gradually from the start of service on the last day, with the last Routemaster to depart from Marble Arch arriving at Brixton Garage at around 14:40.

On 24 August 2010 TfL announced an intention to extend route 159 north from Marble Arch to Paddington Basin and for it subsequently to become a 24-hour route. On 29 March 2014, route 159 was withdrawn between Marble Arch and Paddington Basin.

Arriva London successfully retained route 159 with new contracts starting on 10 December 2005 and 11 December 2010. In June 2015 Abellio London won the contract, which commenced with the introduction of the New Routemaster buses on 12 December 2015.

The route was shortened by four stops on 28 August 2021 due to the pedestrianisation of Oxford Circus. It now terminates on Regent Street.

Current route
Route 159 operates via these primary locations:
Streatham station  
St Leonard's Church
Streatham Hill station 
Brixton station  
Kennington for Oval station 
Lambeth North station 
Lower Marsh
St Thomas' Hospital / County Hall
Westminster Bridge
Westminster station 
Whitehall
Trafalgar Square for Charing Cross station  
Piccadilly Circus station 
Regent Street
Oxford Circus station

References

External links

Bus routes in London
Transport in the London Borough of Lambeth
Transport in the City of Westminster